Lee Center is an unincorporated community in Lee County, Illinois, United States, located  southeast of Dixon. Lee Center has a post office with ZIP code 61331.

It used to have its own little railroad, the Lee County Central Electric Railway.

Demographics

References

Unincorporated communities in Lee County, Illinois
Unincorporated communities in Illinois